John Ferguson (born June 1911, date of death unknown) was a politician in Northern Ireland.

Ferguson was born in Belfast in June 1911 and studied at the Moravian School. He worked as a fruit merchant, becoming chairman of the Retail Fruit Federation of Northern Ireland, and also as a volunteer social workers within Toc H, then joined the Ulster Unionist Party (UUP). He stood for the UUP in Belfast Oldpark at the 1965 Northern Ireland general election, and took 40.5% of the vote, but was not elected. In 1967, he became a Justice of the Peace.

Ferguson was a founder member of the Alliance Party of Northern Ireland, and won a seat on Belfast City Council at the 1973 Northern Ireland local elections. He was also successful in Belfast North at the 1973 Northern Ireland Assembly election, but when he stood in the equivalent Westminster constituency at the October 1974 general election, he took only 8.1% of the vote. He stood again in Belfast North for the Northern Ireland Constitutional Convention, but he narrowly missed re-election.

References

1911 births
Year of death missing
Alliance Party of Northern Ireland councillors
Alliance Party of Northern Ireland politicians
Members of Belfast City Council
Members of the Northern Ireland Assembly 1973–1974
Politicians from Belfast
Ulster Unionist Party councillors
Alliance Party parliamentary candidates